Kwambonambi is a town in King Cetshwayo District Municipality in the KwaZulu-Natal province of South Africa.

Village, centre of sugar and timber areas, 29 km north-east of Empangeni, 30 km south-west of Mtubatuba and 30 km north of Richards Bay. Zulu, ‘place of the Mbonambi’, a tribe which lived there, the name means ‘ill-omen’.

References

Populated places in the uMfolozi Local Municipality